Kevin Quick (born March 29, 1988) is an American former professional ice hockey defenseman. He was selected by the Tampa Bay Lightning in the 3rd round (78th overall) of the 2006 NHL Entry Draft.

Playing career
During the 2008–09 season, Quick made his NHL debut and appeared in 6 games for the Lightning.

On October 1, 2012, Quick signed as a free agent with the South Carolina Stingrays of the ECHL on a one-year contract. During the 2012–13 season, Quick established a career-high 17 points in 64 games with the Stingrays, and was briefly loaned for a 3-game stint in the AHL with the Rockford IceHogs.

On June 19, 2014, Quick signed his first contract abroad agreeing to a one-year contract with the Dundee Stars of the Elite Ice Hockey League. After one season in Scotland with the Stars, Quick returned to North America, signing a one-year contract with the Indy Fuel of the ECHL on July 13, 2015.

In 2016, Quick was transferred to the Asia hockey league and became the alternate captain of China Dragon.

Career statistics

Awards and honors

References

External links

1988 births
Living people
American men's ice hockey defensemen
Augusta Lynx players
China Dragon players
Dundee Stars players
Elmira Jackals (ECHL) players
Florida Everblades players
Ice hockey people from Buffalo, New York
Indy Fuel players
Michigan Wolverines men's ice hockey players
Norfolk Admirals players
Nottingham Panthers players
Rockford IceHogs (AHL) players
South Carolina Stingrays players
Tampa Bay Lightning draft picks
Tampa Bay Lightning players
American expatriate ice hockey players in Scotland
American expatriate ice hockey players in England
American expatriate ice hockey players in China